The 2011 ESF men's EC club championships was an international softball competition being held at Hurricane Park, Hørsholm, Denmark from August 22 to August 27, 2011. It was the 22nd edition of the tournament and in the end, the Hørsholm Hurricanes won their first title.

First round

Pool A

Playoffs

Medal round

Final standings

External links 
 European Cup Men 2011 Official Website
 European Cup Men 2011 Schedule

2011 in Danish sport
2011 in European sport
2011 in softball
Softball in Denmark
Softball in Europe